The Futsal Bundesliga is the highest League in the German futsal league system. The league is largely semi-professional, and the first season was played in 2021.

History 
The DFB has been playing a German Futsal Championship since 2006. Until 2014, the competition was called the DFB Futsal Cup, before the competition was renamed the Deutsche Futsal Meisterschaft. On the 27th September 2019, the introduction of the Futsal Bundesliga from the 2021/22 season was unanimously decided at the DFB Bundestag in Frankfurt am Main. The aim is to further promote the futsal in Germany in order to be internationally competitive.

For the opening season, the champions of the five regional leagues as well as the vice champions of the regional leagues North, Northeast, South and West qualified directly. Tenth place went to the winner of a qualifying round, in which the third-place winners of the regional leagues North, Northeast, South and West and the vice champion of the Regional League Southwest participated.

The inaugural champion was Stuttgarter Futsal Club.

References

Futsal competitions in Germany